Pehr A. B. Harbury (born 1965) is an American biochemist, and Associate Professor of Biochemistry at Stanford University.

He is a native of Menlo Park.
He graduated from Harvard University with a BA, and from Harvard Medical School, with a Ph.D. in Biological Chemistry in 1994.

Awards
 2005 MacArthur Fellows Program
 2005 Director's Pioneer Award, NIH
 2000 Young Investigator in the Pharmacological Sciences, Burroughs Wellcome Fund 
 1999 Searle Scholar, Chicago Community Trust
 1999 MIT Technology Review TR100, as one of the top 100 innovators in the world under the age of 35

References

1965 births
American biochemists
Harvard Medical School alumni
MacArthur Fellows
Living people
Stanford University School of Medicine faculty